Lomilomi may refer to:

 Lomilomi massage, a Hawaiian massage
 Lomi salmon or lomi-lomi salmon, a side dish in Pacific island cuisine